Samara State University was a classical multi-faculty university and a leading educational institution of higher education in Samara Oblast, Russia. It consists of faculties of Mathematics and Mechanics, Physics, Biology, Chemistry, Philology, History, Sociology, Economy and Management, Psychology, and Law. It is considered to be the most prestigious graduate school in Samara and the area, especially with its highly competitive and demanding programmes in the English Language, Law, Sociology and Political Science, International Relations, Psychology. SSU is also marked for its postgraduate research in the Sciences and the Humanities.

SSU had its own newspaper, a regularly printed academic journal, as well as journals for students publications. SSU is a centre of teaching and research in Samara Region with a strong reputation nationally and globally. SSU is one of the few Russian universities that issues the European Diploma Supplement to the State Diploma of Higher Education, which confirms educational standards according to international standards (ECTS). In 2015 it was merged with other institutions to form the Samara National Research University.

The English language is taught here by high-qualified lecturers in several departments.

In 2014 Samara State University celebrated the 95th anniversary since its foundation and the 45th anniversary since its revival. Samara State University is a large scientific, educational and cultural centre of the Volga region with a constantly developing infrastructure. The university being of the classical type preserves the highest educational standards and education quality. The university has one regional branch in Togliatti. At present Samara State University comprises 10 basic faculties: Physics, Chemistry, Biology, Mechanics and Mathematics, History, Philology, Sociology, Psychology, Law, Economics and Management.

Alumni 
Notable alumni of Samara State University include Dmitry Muratov, joint recipient of the 2021 Nobel Peace Prize, and Mikhail Matveyev, member of the State Duma.

References

External links 
 Samara State University
Samara State University/Undergraduate
Overview of Samara State University

Education in Samara, Russia
 
Buildings and structures in Samara Oblast